Animorphs (also known under the promotional title AniTV) is a television adaptation made by Protocol Entertainment based on the Scholastic book series of the same name by K. A. Applegate. It was made for YTV for Season 1 and Global for Season 2 in Canada and Nickelodeon for the United States. The series was broadcast from September 15, 1998 to October 8, 1999 in the United States and Canada.

Cast

Main
 Shawn Ashmore as Jake
 Brooke Nevin as Rachel
 Boris Cabrera as Marco
 Nadia Nascimento as Cassie
 Christopher Ralph as Tobias

Recurring
 Paulo Costanzo as Aximili-Esgarrouth-Isthill
 Eugene Lipinski as Visser Three/Victor Trent
 Dov Tiefenbach as Erek King
 Allegra Fulton as Eva / Visser One
 Joshua Peace as Tom Berenson
 Terra Vanessa Kowalyk as Melissa Chapman
 Richard Sali as Principal Chapman
 Diego Matamoros as Elfangor-Sirinial-Shamtul
 Peter Messaline as the Ellimist
 Frank Pelligrino as Jeremy, Marco's father (Peter in the books)
 Cassandra Van Wyck as Sara Berenson, Rachel's younger sister
 Jonathan Whittaker as Greg, Jake's father (Steve in the books)
 Karen Waddell as Nikki, Jake's mother (Jean in the books)
 Melanie Nicholls-King as Aisha, Cassie's mother (Michelle in the books)

Episodes

Series Overview

Season 1 (1998–99)

Season 2 (1999)

Home releases
Sony Pictures Home Entertainment (when they were known as Columbia TriStar Home Video) had released twelve episodes in four VHS volumes known as The Invasion Series, collecting episodes from the series. The first 12 episodes are only released on VHS and not re-released on DVD.
 Part 1: The Invasion Begins ("My Name is Jake" parts 1 and 2, and "Underground")
Part 2: Nowhere to Run ("Between Friends", "The Message" and "The Reaction")
 Part 3: The Enemy Among Us ("The Stranger", "The Leader" parts 1 and 2)
 Part 4: The Legacy Survives ("The Capture" parts 1 and 2, and "Not My Problem")

Seven volumes spanning the first 20 episodes (only the first of which was identical to its U.S. counterpart) were released in Australia. The episodes were placed in chronological order. Each volume had three episodes apart from Volume 7, which had two ("Face Off", parts 1 and 2).

All 26 episodes are currently available on iTunes, Vudu and Amazon Video spread across three volumes. Also, all 26 episodes were previously available on Netflix.

See also
 List of Animorphs books
 Chronological list of Animorphs books
 Manimal
 Sheena

References

External links
 
 
 

1990s Nickelodeon original programming
1990s American science fiction television series
1990s American teen drama television series
1990s Canadian science fiction television series
1990s Canadian teen drama television series
1998 American television series debuts
1998 Canadian television series debuts
1999 American television series endings
1999 Canadian television series endings
Alien invasions in television
American children's action television series
American children's adventure television series
American children's fantasy television series
American children's science fiction television series
American television shows based on children's books
Canadian children's action television series
Canadian children's adventure television series
Canadian children's fantasy television series
Canadian children's science fiction television series
Canadian television shows based on children's books
English-language television shows
YTV (Canadian TV channel) original programming
Television shows based on American novels
Television shows filmed in Toronto
Works based on Animorphs
Television series about teenagers
Television series about extraterrestrial life
Television series about shapeshifting